Wilburn Cartwright (January 12, 1892 – March 14, 1979) was a lawyer, educator, U.S. Representative from Oklahoma, and United States Army officer in World War II.  The town of Cartwright, Oklahoma is named after him.

Early life
Born on a farm near Georgetown, Tennessee, Cartwright moved with his parents to the Chickasaw Nation, Indian Territory, in 1903.
He attended the public schools at Wapanucka and Ada, Oklahoma, and State Teachers College at Durant, Oklahoma.

Early career
As an educator he taught in the schools of Coal, Atoka, Bryan, and Pittsburg Counties in Oklahoma from 1914 to 1926.  During World War I he served as a private in the Student Army Training Corps in 1917 and 1918.  He studied law and was admitted to the bar in 1917.  He was graduated from the law department of the University of Oklahoma at Norman in 1920.  Afterwards he began a law practice in McAlester, Oklahoma.  Additionally he took postgraduate work at the University of Chicago, Chicago, Illinois.  He served as member of the Oklahoma House of Representatives from 1914 to 1918, and then as a member of the State Senate from 1918 until 1922.  Cartwright was a vocational adviser for disabled veterans at McAlester, Oklahoma, in 1921 and 1922.  He was an unsuccessful candidate for the Democratic nomination for Congress in 1922 and 1924, and served as Superintendent of schools at Krebs, Oklahoma from 1922 to 1926.

Family
Wilburn's great-great uncle was Peter Cartwright, who had defeated Abraham Lincoln in an Illinois legislative race.

His two daughters were Wilburta May Cartwright and Doralyn Emma Cartwright (Lynn Cartwright), who was an actress that was married to actor Leo Gordon.

His nephew, Jan Eric Cartwright, was the Oklahoma Attorney General from 1979 to 1983.

His siblings were Floyd, Gerty, McKinley, Shafter, Dewey, Cecil, Keith, and Clifford (Buck). The last two were also Oklahoma state legislators.

His father, Jackson Robert (JR) Cartwright, was a Baptist preacher and served in the Oklahoma House of Representatives in 1929 and 1931.

United States Congress
Cartwright was elected as a Democrat to the Seventieth and to the seven succeeding Congresses (March 4, 1927 -  January 3, 1943).  He served as chairman of the Committee on Roads (Seventy-third through Seventy-seventh Congresses).  He was an unsuccessful candidate for renomination in 1942. Cartwright was a supporter of the New Deal public works projects in his district.

Military career
He served as a major in the United States Army, Allied Military Government, with service in Africa and Europe from 1943 until he was injured.  He returned to the United States as an instructor at Fort Custer, Michigan, in 1945.  He was employed with the Veterans' Administration at Muskogee, Oklahoma, in 1945 and 1946.

Later life
Cartwright was elected Secretary of State of Oklahoma for four-year term in 1946.  Cartwright was elected State auditor for four-year term in 1950.  Cartwright was elected State corporation commissioner for six-year term in 1954 and reelected in 1960 and 1966.
He was a resident of Oklahoma City, Oklahoma until his death there on March 14, 1979.
He was interred in I.O.O.F. Cemetery, Norman, Oklahoma.

References

External links

 "Cartwright, Wilburn" (1891-1979), Encyclopedia of Oklahoma History and Culture.
 "Cartwright, Wilburn" (1891-1979), Oklahoma Historical Society.
Wilburn Cartwright Collection and Photograph Collection at the Carl Albert Center
 

1892 births
1979 deaths
People from Meigs County, Tennessee
American people of English descent
Democratic Party members of the United States House of Representatives from Oklahoma
Secretaries of State of Oklahoma
20th-century Members of the Oklahoma House of Representatives
Democratic Party Oklahoma state senators
State Auditors of Oklahoma
Oklahoma lawyers
People from McAlester, Oklahoma
Schoolteachers from Oklahoma
School superintendents in Oklahoma
Politicians from Oklahoma City
People from Ada, Oklahoma
20th-century American politicians
Lawyers from Oklahoma City
20th-century American educators
Southeastern Oklahoma State University alumni
University of Oklahoma alumni
University of Chicago alumni
United States Army personnel of World War I
United States Army personnel of World War II
United States Army officers
20th-century American lawyers
Democratic Party members of the Oklahoma House of Representatives